The 1973 World Figure Skating Championships were held from February 26 to March 3 in Bratislava, Czechoslovakia, sanctioned by the International Skating Union. Medals were awarded in men's singles, ladies' singles, pair skating, and ice dance. It was the last year in which solid gold medals were awarded in figure skating.

The opening ceremony was held at the Philharmonic of Bratislava. The Chairman of the organising committee was Miroslav Cerveka.

Irina Rodnina won her first World title with her new partner, Alexander Zaitsev after her previous partner, Alexei Ulanov, chose to skate with Lyudmila Smirnova. Rodnina / Zaitsev's music stopped during their short program, possibly due to a Czech worker acting in retaliation for the suppression of the Prague Spring.

Medal table

Results

Men

Referee:
 Sonia Bianchetti 

Assistant Referee:
 Miroslav Hasenöhrl 

Judges:
 Boris Anokhin 
 Dorothy Leamen 
 Luciana Brasa 
 Walburga Grimm 
 Kazuo Ohashi 
 Dagmar Rehakova 
 Ramona McIntyre 
 Irina Minculescu 
 Geoffrey Yates 

Substitute judge:
 Jürg Wilhelm

Ladies

Sonja Balun of Austria and Krisztina Homolya of Hungary withdrew before the opening ceremony.

Referee:
 Major Josef Dědič 

Assistant Referee:
 Oskar Madl 

Judges:
 Helga von Wiecki 
 Mary Louise Wright 
 Ludwig Gassner 
 Vera Lynfield 
 Elisbeth Bon-Meyer 
 Inkeri Soininen 
 Dr. Jakob Biedermann 
 Joan Maclagan 
 Márta Léces 

Substitute judge:
 Sydney Croll

Pairs

Referee:
 Karl Enderlin 

Assistant Referee:
 Donald H. Gilchrist 

Judges:
 Erich Soukup 
 Valentin Piseev 
 Wladyslaw Kolodziej 
 Alice Pinos 
 Jürg Wilhelm 
 Willi Wernz 
 Walburga Grimm 
 Walter Hüttner 
 Edith M. Shoemaker 

Substitute judge:
 Monique Georgelin

Ice dance

Referee:
 Hermann Schiechtl 

Assistant Referee:
 Lawrence Demmy 

Judges:
 Edith M. Shoemaker 
 Elek Riedl 
 Lysiane Lauret 
 Eugen Romminger 
 Helena Pachlová 
 Mollie Phillips 
 Maria Zuchowicz 
 Irina Absaliamova 
 Frances Gunn 

Substitute judge:
 Cia Bordogna

References

Sources
 Result list provided by the ISU

World Figure Skating Championships
World Figure Skating Championships
World Figure Skating Championships
World Figure Skating Championships
International figure skating competitions hosted by Czechoslovakia
World Figure Skating Championships
World Figure Skating Championships
Sports competitions in Bratislava
1970s in Bratislava